This is a list of notable libertarians in the United States. It includes people who have identified themselves as members of the Libertarian Party or with Libertarianism in their political or social philosophy.

A
 Max Abramson, State Representative from New Hampshire
 Imad-ad-Dean Ahmad, Palestinian-American scholar and the president of the Minaret of Freedom Institute; 2012 Libertarian Party nominee for the U.S. Senate in Maryland
 Norma Jean Almodovar, 1986 Libertarian Party nominee for Lieutenant Governor of California
 Justin Amash, former U.S. Representative from Michigan
 Michael Arrington, founder of TechCrunch
 Cliff Asness, hedge fund manager

B
 Jim Babka, president of the Downsize DC Foundation; chair of the Libertarian Party of Ohio
 Michael Badnarik, 2004 Libertarian Party presidential nominee
 Peter Bagge, cartoonist
 Radley Balko,  journalist, blogger, and author
 Doug Bandow, blogger, columnist, writer, Senior Fellow at the Cato Institute
 John Perry Barlow, lyricist and co-founder of the Electronic Frontier Foundation
 Randy Barnett, legal scholar and law professor
 Bob Barr, former U.S. Representative from Georgia and 2008 Libertarian Party presidential nominee
 Christopher R. Barron, founder of GOProud
 Dave Barry, humor columnist
 Jim Bell, entrepreneur and author of an essay describing a method of killing government officials
 Bruce L. Benson, academic
 David Bergland, 1984 Libertarian Party presidential nominee, and two-time chair of the Libertarian National Committee
 David Bernstein, law professor
 Big Boi, rapper
 Clint Bolick, Associate Justice, Arizona Supreme Court; lawyer and founder of the litigation division of the Goldwater Institute
 Scott Boman, 2008 Libertarian Party nominee for the U.S. Senate in Michigan
 Rupert Boneham, Survivor contestant and 2012 Libertarian Party nominee for Governor of Indiana
 Murray Bookchin, writer
 Neal Boortz, radio host
 Andy Borsa, member of the New Hampshire House of Representatives
 James Bovard, author
 R. W. Bradford, founder of Liberty
 Barbara Branden, Canadian-American writer, editor, and lecturer
 Nathaniel Branden, Canadian–American psychotherapist and writer
 Arthur C. Brooks, author
 Harry Browne, 1996 and 2000 Libertarian Party presidential nominee
 David Brudnoy, talk radio host
 Scott Bullock, civil rights attorney
 Gene Burns, talk show host and candidate for the Libertarian Party's presidential nomination in 1984
 Marshall Burt, member of the Wyoming House of Representatives

C
 Richard Campagna, 2004 Libertarian Party vice-presidential nominee
 Bryan Caplan, economist, writer, and academic
 Drew Carey, comedian and actor
 Dale Carpenter, law professor
 Kevin Carson, political writer and blogger
 Doug Casey, investor, writer, founder and chairman of Casey Research
 Dixie Carter, actress
 Graydon Carter, former editor of Vanity Fair
 Rodney Caston, cybersecurity expert, open-source intelligence investigator, writer, and 2012 Libertarian Party nominee for the Texas House of Representatives
 John Chamberlain, journalist
 Marilyn Chambers, 2004 Personal Choice Party vice-presidential nominee and pornographic actress
 Gary Chartier, legal scholar, philosopher, political theorist, and theologian
 Roy Childs, essayist and critic
 Frank Chodorov, writer
 Ed Clark, 1980 Libertarian Party presidential nominee
 Spike Cohen, entrepreneur, podcaster, and 2020 Libertarian Party vice-presidential nominee
 Chris Cole, 2008 Libertarian nominee for the U.S. Senate in North Carolina
 Michael Colley, U.S. Navy vice admiral and member of the board of directors of the Libertarian Party
 Barry Cooper, drug policy reform activist, filmmaker, Libertarian candidate for U.S. House of Representatives in Texas in 2008 and for Texas Attorney General in 2010
 Richard Cornuelle, activist, political theorist, and author
 Tyler Cowen,  economist, columnist, author, and blogger
 Ed Crane, co-founder of the Cato Institute

D
 Aubrey Dunn, Jr., former New Mexico commissioner of public lands and Libertarian candidate for U.S. Senate in 2018
 Caleb Q. Dyer,  former member of the New Hampshire House of Representatives

E
 Charlie Earl, former member of the Ohio House of Representatives, Libertarian Party candidate in the 2014 Ohio gubernatorial election
 Clint Eastwood, actor
 Richard Epstein, legal scholar, academic, and writer

F
 Ken Fanning, member of the Alaska House of Representatives
 Arthur Farnsworth, Libertarian Party nominee for the U.S. House of Representatives convicted of tax evasion in 2006
 Fred Foldvary, academic, economist, and writer 
 Kmele Foster, political commentator and telecommunications entrepreneur
 Conor Friedersdorf, journalist, staff writer at The Atlantic
 David D. Friedman, economist, physicist, legal scholar, political theorist, and author
 Milton Friedman, economist, statistician, and writer
 Patri Friedman, activist, political theorist; founder of The Seasteading Institute
 Rose Friedman, economist

G
 Eric Garris, founder of Antiwar.com
 John T. Georgopoulos, founder of SportsGrumblings.com, fantasy sports journalist for various publications, former SiriusXM show host, podcast producer and host
 Nick Gillespie, journalist who has served as a writer, contributor, and editor for Reason magazine, Reason.com, and ReasonTV 
 Dan Gookin, author, 2004 Libertarian Party nominee for the Idaho Senate and 2007 Libertarian nominee for the Coeur d'Alene city council
 Daniel P. Gordon, former member of the Rhode Island House of Representatives from 2011 to 2013, who changed his party affiliation from Republican to Libertarian; at the time, he was the only Libertarian serving in any state legislative house in the country
 Don Gorman, former member of the New Hampshire House of Representatives
 Jim Gray, former presiding judge of the Superior Court of Orange County, California; 2012 Libertarian vice-presidential nominee and candidate for the 2020 Libertarian presidential nomination
 Greg Gutfeld, host of The Greg Gutfeld Show and one of five co-hosts and panelists on the political talk show The Five, both on the Fox News Channel

H
 F. A. Harper, academic, economist, and writer;  founder of the Institute for Humane Studies
 Phil Harvey, entrepreneur and philanthropist, President of Adam & Eve
 Henry Hazlitt, journalist, editor, economist, and author
 Gene Healy, political pundit, journalist, editor, and author; Vice President at the Cato Institute and contributing editor to Liberty magazine
 Karl Hess, activist, speechwriter, journalist, editor, and political philosopher
 Jeff Hewitt, Riverside County, California Supervisor, and Libertarian gubernatorial candidate in the 2021 California gubernatorial recall election
 Robert Higgs, economist, historian, and writer
 John Holt, author and educator, a proponent of unschooling, and a pioneer in youth rights theory
 John Hospers, philosophy professor and 1972 Libertarian Party presidential nominee
 Carla Howell, activist and 2002 Libertarian Party nominee for Governor of Massachusetts
 Michael Huemer, academic, philosopher, and writer

J
 Paul Jacob, activist and commentator
 Glenn Jacobs, wrestler known as Kane
 Penn Jillette, magician
 Gary Johnson, former Governor of New Mexico and 2012 and 2016 Libertarian Party presidential nominee
 Stan Jones, 2002 Libertarian Party nominee for the U.S. Senate in Montana
 Alex Joseph, mayor of Big Water, Utah
 Jo Jorgensen, 1996 Libertarian Party vice-presidential nominee and 2020 Presidential nominee
 Eric July, musician, YouTuber, comic book writer, and political commentator

K
 Rob Kampia, activist, 2000 Libertarian Party nominee for delegate to the U.S. House of Representatives in the District of Columbia
 Chris Kluwe, former punter for the Minnesota Vikings
 Charles G. Koch, businessman
 David H. Koch, businessman and 1980 Libertarian Party vice-presidential nominee
 Adam Kokesh, activist, author, and 2020 candidate for the Libertarian presidential nomination
 Bart Kosko, writer, academic, researcher; contributing editor to Liberty
 Alex Kozinski, Chief Judge of the United States Court of Appeals for the Ninth Circuit
 Steve Kubby, activist, writer, and 1998 Libertarian Party nominee for Governor of California and 2000 candidate for the Libertarian vice-presidential nomination

L
 Philip Labonte, musician, singer for heavy metal band All That Remains
 Suzanne La Follette, individualist feminist, political theorist, journalist, and editor
 Sonny Landham, actor and 2008 Libertarian Party nominee for the U.S. Senate in Kentucky, with whom the party cut ties in July of that year
 Rose Wilder Lane, journalist, travel writer, novelist, and political theorist
 James A. Lewis, 1984 Libertarian Party vice-presidential nominee
 Kurt Loder, entertainment critic, author, columnist, and media personality
 Dan Loeb, hedge fund manager
 Nancy Lord, attorney, medical researcher, and 1992 Libertarian Party vice-presidential nominee

M
 Roger MacBride, lawyer and 1976 Libertarian Party presidential nominee
 Spencer MacCallum, anthropologist, business consultant and author
 John Mackey, CEO and co-founder of Whole Foods Market
 Michael Malice, Ukrainian-American author, podcaster, columnist, and media personality
 Andre Marrou, former member of the Alaska House of Representatives and 1992 Libertarian Party presidential nominee
 John McAfee, computer programmer, businessman, and presidential candidate
 Peter McWilliams, self-help author and activist
 Russell Means, Sioux rights activist, actor and 1988 candidate for the Libertarian Party presidential nomination
 Jeffrey Miron, economist and academic
 John Monds, 2008 Libertarian Party nominee for the Georgia Public Service Commission and 2010 Libertarian nominee for Governor of Georgia
 Lisa Kennedy Montgomery, American political commentator, radio personality, author, former MTV VJ, and the current host of Kennedy on the Fox Business Network
 Kary Mullis, 1993 Nobel Prize Winner in Chemistry for the invention of the polymerase chain reaction technique
 Michael Munger, 2008 Libertarian Party nominee for Governor of North Carolina
 Rupert Murdoch, media mogul and founder of global media holding company News Corporation

N
 Loretta Nall, 2006 Libertarian Party nominee for Governor of Alabama
 Andrew Napolitano, former New Jersey Superior Court Judge and host of Freedom Watch
 Tonie Nathan, 1972 Libertarian Party vice-presidential nominee
 David Nolan, principal founder of the Libertarian Party and candidate for office in Arizona
 Gary Nolan, talk radio personality and 2004 candidate for the Libertarian Party presidential nomination
 Robert Nozick, philosopher

O
 Gary Oldman, actor
 Art Olivier, 2000 Libertarian Party vice-presidential nominee

P
 Tom G. Palmer, writer and political theorist
 Trey Parker, actor, animator and screenwriter. Parker described himself in 2001 as "a registered Libertarian"
 Isabel Paterson, Canadian-American journalist, novelist, and political philosopher
 Rand Paul, U.S. Senator from Kentucky and son of Ron Paul
 Ron Paul, former U.S. Representative from Texas and 1988 Libertarian Party presidential nominee
 Carl Person, attorney and 2012 candidate for the Libertarian Party presidential nomination
 Austin Petersen, activist, commentator, broadcaster, candidate for the 2016 Libertarian presidential nomination
 John Popper, frontman of the rock band Blues Traveler
 Virginia Postrel, columnist, blogger, author, former editor-in-chief of Reason magazine
 Sharon Presley, writer, activist, academic; co-founder of Laissez Faire Books, and executive director of the Association of Libertarian Feminists

R
 Ralph Raico, historian, academic, and writer
 Justin Raimondo, founder of Antiwar.com
 Dick Randolph, member of the Alaska House of Representatives
 Earl Ravenal, Georgetown University professor and 1984 candidate for the Libertarian Party presidential nomination
 Leonard Read, writer, economist; founder of the Foundation for Economic Education (FEE)
 Warren Redlich, member of the Guilderland town council and 2010 Libertarian Party nominee for Governor of New York
 Wayne Allyn Root, radio host, businessperson, author; 2008 Libertarian Party vice-presidential nominee
 Murray Rothbard, economist and political philosopher
 Finlay Rothhaus, member of the New Hampshire House of Representatives
 Kurt Russell, actor
 Aaron Russo, film producer and 2004 candidate for the Libertarian Party presidential nomination
 Mary Ruwart, biophysicist and 2008 candidate for the Libertarian Party presidential nomination

S
 Murray Sabrin, 1997 Libertarian nominee for Governor of New Jersey
 Julian Sanchez, journalist, blogger, and editor
 Robert Sarvis, attorney, 2013 Libertarian nominee for Governor of Virginia, and 2014 Libertarian nominee for U.S. Senate in Virginia
 Nicholas Sarwark, attorney and businessperson; former chair of Libertarian National Committee
 Peter Schiff, financial analyst, stockbroker, author, one-time Senate candidate, president and CEO of Euro Pacific Capital Inc.
 Larry Sharpe, entrepreneur, podcaster, and 2018 Libertarian nominee for Governor of New York
 Michael Shermer, science writer and founder of The Skeptics Society
 Julian Simon,  economist, academic, and writer
 Paul Singer, founder and CEO of Elliott Management Corporation and founder of the Paul E. Singer Family Foundation
 Sam Sloan, 2010 candidate for the Libertarian nomination for Governor of New York
 Robby Soave, journalist,  author, senior editor for Reason 
 Ilya Somin, academic, blogger, author, adjunct scholar at the Cato Institute
 John Sophocleus, economics instructor and 2002 Libertarian nominee for Governor of Alabama
 Thomas Sowell, academic, economist, commentator, and social theorist
 Joseph Stallcop, former member of the New Hampshire House of Representatives
 Doug Stanhope, stand-up comedian
 Matt Stone, actor, animator and screenwriter
 John Stossel, consumer reporter, investigative journalist, author, columnist
 Jacob Sullum, syndicated columnist, journalist, and senior editor at Reason magazine
 Vermin Supreme, performance artist, candidate for the 2020 Libertarian Party presidential nomination
 Thomas Szasz, intellectual, author, opponent of medical coercion, advocate of the rights of adults to use drugs and to commit suicide

T
 Kristin Tate, political commentator, columnist & author
 Joan Kennedy Taylor, journalist, author, editor, and activist
 Peter Thiel, co-founder of PayPal
 Ed Thompson, mayor of Tomah, Wisconsin and 2002 Libertarian Party nominee for Governor of Wisconsin
 Katherine Timpf, columnist, television personality, reporter, and comedian
 Christina Tobin, founder of the Free and Equal Elections Foundation and 2010 Libertarian Party nominee for California Secretary of State
  Maj Toure, political activist and rapper; founder of Black Guns Matter
 Jeffrey Tucker, political theorist, editor, writer, and internet entrepreneur

V
 Jimmie Vaughan, musician
 Vince Vaughn, actor

W
 Rufus Wainwright, singer-songwriter
 Jimmy Wales, co-founder of Wikipedia
 Calvin Warburton, member of the New Hampshire House of Representatives and 1992 candidate for the Libertarian Party vice-presidential nomination
 David Weigel, journalist, blogger, contributing editor for Reason magazine 
 Matt Welch, blogger and journalist; writer and editor for Reason magazine
 Bill Weld, former Governor of Massachusetts and 2016 Libertarian vice-presidential nominee
 Walter E. Williams, economist, commentator, and academic
 Richard Winger, editor of Ballot Access News
 Tom Woods, author and radio host
 Adrian Wyllie, 2014 candidate for the Libertarian Party nomination for Governor of Florida

References

American libertarians
Libertarians in the United States